In organophosphorus chemistry, the Kinnear–Perren reaction (sometimes the Clay-Kinnear-Perren reaction) is used to prepare alkylphosphonyl dichlorides (RP(O)Cl2) and alkylphosphonate esters (RP(O)(OR')2). The reactants are alkyl chloride, phosphorus trichloride, and aluminium trichloride as catalyst. The reaction proceeds via the alkyltrichlorophosphonium salt:
RCl + PCl3 + AlCl3 → [RPCl3]+AlCl4−

Reduction of this trichlorophosphonium intermediate with aluminium powder gives alkyldichlorophosphines (RPCl2).

Partial hydrolysis of the same intermediate gives the alkylphosphonyl dichloride: 
[RPCl3]+AlCl4− + H2O → RP(O)Cl2 + AlCl3 + 2 HCl

The reaction was first reported by Clay and expanded upon by Kinnear and Perren, who demonstrated that the four chlorinated methanes (CH4−xClx) give the corresponding CH3-, CH2Cl-, CHCl2-, and CCl3-substituted derivatives. They also demonstrated workup with hydrogen sulfide to give the alkylthiophosphoryl dichlorides.

References

Substitution reactions
Name reactions